Wesley Morris (born 1975) is an American film critic and podcast host. He is currently critic-at-large for The New York Times, as well as co-host, with Jenna Wortham, of the New York Times podcast Still Processing. Previously, Morris wrote for The Boston Globe, then Grantland. He won the 2012 Pulitzer Prize for Criticism for his work with The Globe and the 2021 Pulitzer Prize for Criticism for his New York Times coverage of race relations in the United States, making Morris the only writer to have won the Criticism prize more than once.

Early life
Morris was born and raised in Philadelphia. He attended high school at Girard College, graduating in 1993. While a high school student, he wrote for the Philadelphia Inquirer'''s teen supplement, "Yo! Fresh Ink." In 1997 he graduated from Yale University, where he had been a film critic at The Yale Daily News for four years.

Career
Morris joined The Boston Globe in 2002, where he reviewed films alongside Ty Burr. Morris and Burr also made regular appearances on NECN to discuss the latest films and do the weekly Take Two film review video series on Boston.com.

Before joining the Globe, he wrote film reviews and essays for the San Francisco Examiner and the San Francisco Chronicle. He is featured in the 2009 documentary film For the Love of Movies: The Story of American Film Criticism discussing the impact of video store shopping on the importance of film criticism, and how critic Harry Knowles started a questionable revolution of amateurs writing film criticism.

In 1999, he was one of many film critics who temporarily co-reviewed films with Roger Ebert on his television program in place of Gene Siskel, who was ultimately replaced by Richard Roeper.

From 2013 to 2015 Wesley Morris wrote for ESPN's website Grantland.

In October 2015, Morris joined The New York Times as critic-at-large, contributing to the newspaper as well as The New York Times Magazine.

In September 2016, Morris and Times colleague Jenna Wortham began hosting a podcast called Still Processing, produced by The New York Times and podcasting company Pineapple Street Media. The podcast received enthusiastic reviews and was named in several year-end lists of the best podcasts of 2016.

 Preferences 
 Favorite films 
Morris participated in the 2012 Sight & Sound critics' poll, where he listed his 10 favorite films as follows: Au Hasard Balthazar (France, 1966)Battleship Potemkin (Russia, 1925)Do the Right Thing (USA, 1989)Metropolis (German, 1927)Naked (UK, 1993)A One and a Two (Taiwan, 1999)Sunrise: A Song of Two Humans (USA, 1927)Taxi Driver (USA, 1976)There Will Be Blood (USA, 2007)Vertigo (USA, 1958)

Awards
In 2011, Morris won the Pulitzer Prize for Criticism for his work at The Boston Globe; the award cited "his smart, inventive film criticism, distinguished by pinpoint prose and an easy traverse between the art house and the big-screen box office."

In 2015, Morris was a finalist for the National Magazine Award for Columns and Commentary, recognized for his 2014 Grantland columns, "Let's Be Real," "After Normal," and "If U Seek Amy."

In 2021, Morris won his second Pulitzer Prize for criticism, for a series of essays in The New York Times'' which the Pulitzer citation praised for “unrelentingly relevant and deeply engaged criticism on the intersection of race and culture in America, written in singular style, alternatively playful and profound."

Personal life
He has come out as gay.

References

External links

Biography and film reviews at the Globe website
Appearance on NECN with film critic Ty Burr

1975 births
African-American journalists
American film critics
Pulitzer Prize for Criticism winners
The Boston Globe people
San Francisco Examiner people
San Francisco Chronicle people
LGBT people from Pennsylvania
LGBT African Americans
Yale University alumni
African-American writers
Writers from Philadelphia
Living people
Place of birth missing (living people)
Journalists from Pennsylvania
The New York Times people
American podcasters
American gay writers
21st-century African-American people
20th-century African-American people